The Biscayne Aquifer, named after Biscayne Bay, is a surficial aquifer. It is a shallow layer of highly permeable limestone under  a portion of South Florida.

Description
The water-absorbing layers of rock underlying south Florida divide into three layers. The Biscayne Aquifer is closest to the surface and because of this it directly interacts with natural and man-made bodies of surface water, such as streams, lakes, canals and reservoirs. The ground water and the aquifer currently are managed as an integrated water system.

Because the top part of the  Biscayne aquifer is the water table, this aquifer is known as an unconfined aquifer. Since it merges with the floor of Biscayne Bay and with the Atlantic Ocean, it is also a coastal aquifer. Both of these factors contribute to its potential contamination. Lowered water tables, primarily from over-pumping, could allow salt water intrusion without man-made interventions such as dam-like structures that control fresh and salt water levels in canals. Because the aquifer is so close to the surface, it is extremely vulnerable to surface contaminants. A massive saltwater plume is radiating from the Turkey Point Nuclear Generating Station toward wellfields in the aquifer.

Management

The South Florida Water Management District controls an extensive system of canals and other control systems and pumping stations along with the Biscayne Aquifer, Lake Okeechobee and three other large water conservation areas as it monitors and controls the storage and release of the water in the district. It must take into account the danger of salt water intrusion and monitor water demand while it manages surplus flood water and maintains water table levels and adequate water supplies.

The Biscayne Aquifer supplies South Florida metropolitan area with its primary source of fresh water. This area includes most of south Florida (Miami-Dade, Monroe, and  parts of Broward Counties) as well was other urban areas stretching from Homestead, Florida to Delray Beach, Florida. Further, water from the Biscayne Aquifer is piped to the Florida Keys.

Footnotes

External links
Description of Biscayne Aquifer

Aquifers in the United States
Hydrology
Geologic formations of the United States
Geology of Florida